Varetz is a railway station in Varetz, Nouvelle-Aquitaine, France. The station is located on the Nexon - Brive railway line. The station is served by TER (local) services operated by SNCF.

Train services
The following services currently call at Varetz:
local service (TER Nouvelle-Aquitaine) Limoges - Saint-Yrieix - Brive-la-Gaillarde

References

Railway stations in Corrèze